Baron Jacques Félix Emmanuel Hamelin (13 October 1768 – 23 April 1839) was a rear admiral of the French navy and later a Baron. He commanded numerous naval expeditions and battles with the Royal Navy as well as exploratory voyages in the Indian Ocean and the South Seas.

Early life
Hamelin was born in Honfleur, Calvados, France. At age 17, Hamelin embarked on a trade ship belonging to his uncle as a young marine to learn sailing. In April 1786, he was a crew member of the ship Asie of the merchant marine which was destined for the coast of Angola on a ten-month campaign. He then proceeded to Cherbourg on board the Triton as a helmsman. In July 1788, Hamelin returned to Honfleur, where he embarked as a midshipman on the ship Jeune Mina and campaigns on several other vessels.

French Navy
He was conscripted by the French Revolutionary Government for the French Revolutionary Wars and in 1792, quit commercial sailing and joined the Navy. In August 1792 he was a quartermaster aboard the vessel Entreprenant which was a part of a naval division under Rear Admiral Louis-René Levassor de Latouche Tréville. Tréville's division joined together with another squadron of Admiral Truguet and took part in operations against Oneglia, Cagliari, and Nice. In August 1793 Hamelin was named midshipman of the frigate Proserpine, with which he took over the Dutch frigate Vigilante and part of the convoy she was escorting. He was promoted to lieutenant in August 1795, and on Minerve, took part in the action of 7 March 1795, in which HMS Berwick was captured.

He took part in the action of 7 October 1795, in which Rear-Admiral de Richery's squadron met with a British convoy bound for Smyrna, capturing 30 out of 31 merchant ships, and retaking the 74 gun Censeur. On 21 November 1796, Hamelin was promoted to capitaine de frégate (commander) and took a commission as first officer of Révolution. He took part in the French expedition to support the Irish Rebellion. Hamelin subsequently took command of the Fraternité for three months, after which took command of Précieuse, part of a squadron under Admiral Eustache Bruix. He then embarked as second-in-command on the Formidable.

Exploration of the South Seas
From 1 October 1800 to 23 June 1803, Hamelin captained the bomb ship Naturaliste, along with Captain Nicolas Baudin on Géographe, on a scientific expedition exploring the South Seas. This voyage was intended as a scientific exploration of New Holland and the charting of the as yet unknown southern coastline. There were no instructions from the French government to claim any land in the name of France. This expedition returned to France the largest collection of plants animals and seeds from New Holland and Timor that Europe had ever seen, including two short-legged emus from King Island who lived out their days in Josephine's garden. 

Baudin rejected ideas amongst his crewmen that they should found a settlement there, and he wrote letters back home to this effect.  A party of Hamelin's men discovered a plate, left by Willem de Vlamingh in 1697, which had in turn replaced an earlier plate left by Dirk Hartog in 1616. Hamelin's men initially removed the plate but it was returned on his orders and left intact until a later visit by Louis de Freycinet in 1818. De Freycinet was on Hamelin's 1801 crew. On his return to France, Hamelin was promoted to captaine de vaisseau (captain), and oversaw the weaponry of the large fleet intended for the invasion of England.

Mauritius

In July 1806, Hamelin took command of the frigate Vénus from Le Havre. He set sail for Isle de France (now Mauritius), seizing four ships along the way. In March 1809, Vénus entered Port Napoléon (formerly Port-Louis, Isle de France). This is the start of the Mauritius campaign of 1809–1811 between the French and the British, to maintain control of these well-located islands between the coast of Africa and India. On 26 April, after orders from the general captain of Mauritius to leave, he sailed off, having under his command Vénus, the frigate Manche, the brig Entreprenant, and the schooner Créole.

He visited Foulpointe on the east coast of Madagascar. Besieged by local Madagascan tribesmen, he moved on the Bay of Bengal, entered Saint George's channel in the Nicobar Islands, seized several British merchant ships, sinking a number of small ships sent out by the British, and on 18 November 1809, seized the British colony of Tappanouti. On the return voyage to Mauritius, he captured three East India Company East Indiamen in the action of 18 November 1809. On his return trip, he seized several more British ships, until he encountered HMS Ceylon on 17–18 September 1810. Ceylon was captured, but the next day a British frigate squadron captured both Ceylon and Vénus.

Hero's return
On returning to France in February 1811 Hamelin was presented to Napoleon I, Emperor of the French, and made a Commandeur de la Légion d'honneur, created a Baron of Empire, raised to the rank of rear-admiral and named commander of a division of the squadron under the orders of Admiral Édouard Thomas Burgues de Missiessy. In April 1818 he moved to Toulon as general major of the navy, a post that he occupied until 18 May 1822. In early 1823, he was bestowed the rank of Grand Officer de la Légion d'Honneur. In 1832 Baron Hamelin was appointed Inspector General of Marine Crews, and in 1833 he was named Director of Marine Cartography. He retired shortly after, and died in Paris. His nephew was Admiral Ferdinand-Alphonse Hamelin.

Legacy

The completion of the hero's welcome in 1811 was that his name was inscribed on the Arc de Triomphe in Paris, on the north pillar, the only naval officer to be so honored from the Napoleonic Wars. He was second in command during the Battle of Grand Port, a naval battle won by the French off the coast of Mauritius. The battle is the only French naval battle to be inscribed on the Arc de Triomphe.

See also
European and American voyages of scientific exploration
Cape Leeuwin
Cape Naturaliste
Geographe Bay
Hamelin Bay

References
Edward Duyker François Péron: An Impetuous Life: Naturalist and Voyager, Miegunyah/MUP, Melb., 2006,
 Fornasiero, Jean; Monteath, Peter and West-Sooby, John.  Encountering Terra Australis: the Australian voyages of Nicholas Baudin and Matthew Flinders, Kent Town, South Australia, Wakefield Press, 2004. 
Frank Horner, The French Reconnaissance: Baudin in Australia 1801—1803, Melbourne University Press, Melbourne, 1987 .
 "Jacques Félix Emmanuel Hamelin", in C. Mullié, Biographie des célébrités militaires des armées de terre et de mer de 1789 à 1850, XIXe siècle 
 This article draws heavily on the Jacques Félix Emmanuel Hamelin article in the French Wikipedia, which was accessed in the version of 26 July 2006.
 Marchant, Leslie R. French Napoleonic Placenames of the South West Coast, Greenwood, WA. R.I.C. Publications, 2004. 
Taillemite, E. Dictionnaire des marins français, Editions Maritimes et d’Outre-Mer, Paris, 1982, p. 156.

Further reading
 Playford, Phillip E.(1998) Voyage of discovery to Terra Australis : by Willem De Vlamingh in 1696-97'' Perth, W.A. Western Australian Museum. 

1768 births
1839 deaths
People from Honfleur
French Navy admirals
French explorers
Explorers of Australia
Explorers of Western Australia
French naval commanders of the Napoleonic Wars
Deputies of the 12th National Assembly of the French Fifth Republic
Knights of the Order of Saint Louis
Grand Officiers of the Légion d'honneur
Names inscribed under the Arc de Triomphe